In Greek mythology, the name Theiodamas or Thiodamas may refer to:
Theiodamas, king of the Dryopes, father of Hylas by the nymph Menodice, daughter of Orion. The Bibliotheca and Apollonius Rhodius relate of him that one day when he was working the land with a plough pulled by two bulls, he encountered Heracles. The latter, being short of food at the moment, slaughtered one of Theiodamas' bulls and consumed it. Theiodamas attempted to start a fight over the bull and was killed by Heracles. Apollonius Rhodius suggests that the incident was simply a pretext for Heracles to start a war against the unjust Dryopes; according to Apollodorus, Heracles did conquer the people in alliance with Ceyx of Trachis. In some accounts, Hylas' parentage was given as Euphemus or even King Ceyx of Trachis.
Theiodamas, a seer, son of Melampus. He followed Adrastus in the war of the Seven against Thebes and was chosen to replace Amphiaraus, who had been swallowed up by the earth, and the leader of a night attack, proposed by him himself on divine inspiration, on sleeping Thebans surrounding the Argive camp after the latter's death.
Theiodamas of Lydia, father of Dresaeus by the nymph Neaera. His son was a defender of Troy in the Trojan War and was killed by Polypoetes, son of Pirithous.

Notes

References 

 Apollodorus, The Library with an English Translation by Sir James George Frazer, F.B.A., F.R.S. in 2 Volumes, Cambridge, MA, Harvard University Press; London, William Heinemann Ltd. 1921. . Online version at the Perseus Digital Library. Greek text available from the same website.
Antoninus Liberalis, The Metamorphoses of Antoninus Liberalis translated by Francis Celoria (Routledge 1992). Online version at the Topos Text Project.
 Apollonius Rhodius, Argonautica translated by Robert Cooper Seaton (1853-1915), R. C. Loeb Classical Library Volume 001. London, William Heinemann Ltd, 1912. Online version at the Topos Text Project.
 Apollonius Rhodius, Argonautica. George W. Mooney. London. Longmans, Green. 1912. Greek text available at the Perseus Digital Library.
 Gaius Julius Hyginus, Fabulae from The Myths of Hyginus translated and edited by Mary Grant. University of Kansas Publications in Humanistic Studies. Online version at the Topos Text Project.
 Quintus Smyrnaeus, The Fall of Troy translated by Way. A. S. Loeb Classical Library Volume 19. London: William Heinemann, 1913. Online version at theio.com
 Quintus Smyrnaeus, The Fall of Troy. Arthur S. Way. London: William Heinemann; New York: G.P. Putnam's Sons. 1913. Greek text available at the Perseus Digital Library.
 Sextus Propertius, Elegies from Charm. Vincent Katz. trans. Los Angeles. Sun & Moon Press. 1995. Online version at the Perseus Digital Library. Latin text available at the same website.

Kings in Greek mythology
Mythological Greek seers
Characters in Seven against Thebes
Anatolian characters in Greek mythology
Argive characters in Greek mythology
Thessalian characters in Greek mythology
Mythology of Heracles
Theban mythology